Several ships have been named :

 , a  light cruiser in the Imperial Japanese Navy during World War II
 , an  that entered into service of the Japanese Maritime Self-Defense Force in 1989

See also 
 Jinzū River

Japanese Navy ship names